Yisrael Guri (1893 – 17 September 1965) was an Israeli politician who served as a member of the Knesset for Mapai between 1949 and 1965.

Biography
Born Yisrael Gurfinkel in Hirişeni, Orgeyevsky Uyezd, Bessarabia Governorate, Russian Empire (in present-day Moldova), Guri was educated in a heder and a high school in Chişinău, where he was a member of Tzeiri Zion, before attending the University of Odessa. In Odessa he became secretary of the local branch of the Jewish National Fund and of the Urban Zionist Committee.

He made aliyah to Palestine in 1919, and was a member of Hapoel Hatzair. Between 1922 and 1931 he was a member of Tel Aviv Workers Council. He served as a member of the Assembly of Representatives, and was secretary of the Central Controller Committee of the Histadrut trade union. In 1929 he became a member of Tel Aviv City Council, a role he retained until 1950, and in 1935 became a member of its Cultural Department.

In 1949 he was elected to the first Knesset on the Mapai list. He was re-elected in 1951, 1955, 1959 and 1961. He died in September 1965, whilst still an MK.

References

External links
 

1893 births
1965 deaths
People from Telenești District
People from Orgeyevsky Uyezd
Moldovan Jews
Bessarabian Jews
Jews from the Russian Empire
Soviet emigrants to Mandatory Palestine
Israeli people of Moldovan-Jewish descent
Israeli Jews
Mapai politicians
Members of the Assembly of Representatives (Mandatory Palestine)
Israeli trade unionists
Moldovan Zionists
Members of the 1st Knesset (1949–1951)
Members of the 2nd Knesset (1951–1955)
Members of the 3rd Knesset (1955–1959)
Members of the 4th Knesset (1959–1961)
Members of the 5th Knesset (1961–1965)
Burials at Nahalat Yitzhak Cemetery